The Alice Springs Correctional Centre, an Australian medium to maximum security prison for males and females, is located  outside Alice Springs, Northern Territory, Australia. The centre is managed by Northern Territory Correctional Services, an agency of the Department of Justice of the Government of the Northern Territory. The centre detains sentenced and charged felons under Northern Territory and/or Commonwealth law.

Facilities
It has a total capacity for 470 inmates in a variety of security classifications. The centre serves as the main maximum security prison for the Northern Territory. Within a secure compound, up to 316 inmates are accommodated. In a low security environment, located outside the main perimeter fence, 84 units operate with minimal supervision.

An active art program at the centre enables inmates to develop art and business skills. All proceeds from the sale of art works go to victims of crime and support prison programs.

History
In 1992,  of land was excised from the Owen Springs pastoral lease to create the site for the centre.  The centre opened in 1996 and received all of the inmates from the former HM Gaol & Labour Prison in Alice Springs.

Notable prisoners
Bradley John Murdochserving life imprisonment for the 2001 murder of English backpacker Peter Falconio.
 Dylan Voller – teargassed by prison officers before being shackled in a restraint chair by his neck, ankle and wrists and forced to wear a spit hood.

See also
 Alice Springs Juvenile Holding Centre
 Crime in Alice Springs

References

External links
Official webpage
Department of Justice website

Prisons in the Northern Territory
Maximum security prisons in the Northern Territory
Buildings and structures in Alice Springs
1996 establishments in Australia